"La La La" is the debut single by American singer Auburn. It was supposed to be on the album called One on One, originally set to be released August 10, 2010. The track features British Virgin Islands singer Iyaz, and was produced by J. R. Rotem. Released in June 2010, it reached number 51 on the Billboard Hot 100, and number 22 on the Mainstream Top 40 airplay chart. The song samples ATC's "Around the World (La La La La La)".

Music video 
The music video premiered on September 9, 2010.

Track listing 
Digital download
 "La La La" (featuring Iyaz) – 3:12

Charts

Certifications

Release history

References 

2010 songs
2010 debut singles
Iyaz songs
Song recordings produced by J. R. Rotem